Álvaro Alejandro Delgado Sciaraffia (born 13 May 1995) is a Chilean footballer who plays for Rangers de Talca.

Honours
Deportes Iquique
 Copa Chile: 2013–14

Coquimbo Unido
 Primera B de Chile: 2018

References

External links
 

1995 births
Living people
People from Iquique
Chilean footballers
Deportes Iquique footballers
Ñublense footballers
Coquimbo Unido footballers
Audax Italiano footballers
Rangers de Talca footballers
Chilean Primera División players
Primera B de Chile players
Association football midfielders